The Hmu language (hveb Hmub), also known as Qiandong Miao (黔东, Eastern Guizhou Miao), Central Miao (中部苗语), East Hmongic (Ratliff 2010), or (somewhat ambiguously) Black Miao, is a dialect cluster of Hmongic languages of China. The best studied dialect is that of Yǎnghāo (养蒿) village, Taijiang County, Guizhou Province.

Qanu (咯努), a Hmu variety, had 11,450 speakers as of 2000, and is spoken just south of Kaili City, Guizhou. The Qanu are ethnoculturally distinct from the other Hmu.

Names
Ná-Meo, spoken by the Mieu people of Cao Minh Commune, Tràng Định District, Lạng Sơn Province, Vietnam, may be closely related.

Subdivisions and distribution

Wang (1985)
Wang Fushi (1985) groups the Qiandong Miao languages as follows.

Northern: 1,000,000 speakers in Kaili, Majiang, Nandan, Longlin, Leishan, Taijiang, Huangping, Jianhe, Zhenyuan, Sansui, Shibing, Sandu, Fuquan, Pingba, Zhenning, Xingren, Zhenfeng, Anlong, Wangmo, etc.
Eastern: 250,000 speakers in Jinping, Liping, Jianhe, Jingzhou, Tongdao, Huitong, etc.
Southern: 350,0000 speakers in Rongjiang, Congjiang, Nandan, Sandu, Rongshui, Sanjiang, etc. Includes Na Meo of northern Vietnam.
Western (Raojia): 15,000 speakers in Heba of Majiang, Mianluo of Duyun, Sandu, Rongjiang, parts of Nandan

Wu (2009)
Wu Zhengbiao (2009) divides Hmu into seven different dialects. Past classifications usually included only three or four dialects. For example, Li Jinping & Li Tianyi (2012), based on past classifications, divide Hmu into the three dialects of Northern, Southern, and Eastern. Datapoint locations of representative dialects are from Li Yunbing (2000).

Eastern (Representative dialect: Sanjiang township 三江乡, Jinping County, Guizhou)
Jinping County, Guizhou (in Ouli 偶里寨 of Ouli Township 偶里乡, etc.)
Hekou 河口 dialect (10,000+ speakers): spoken in Hekou 河口乡, Wenniu 文牛乡, and Zhanghua 彰化乡 townships
Ouli 偶里 dialect (20,000+ speakers): spoken in Pinglve 平略乡, Ouli 偶里乡, Zhaizao 寨早乡, Jiaosan 皎三乡, Maoping 茅坪乡, Guazhi 挂治乡, Pingjin 平金乡, and Suijiang 稳江乡, Loujiang 娄江乡, and Tongpo 铜坡乡 townships
Yuhe 裕河 dialect (about 3,000 speakers): spoken in Yuhe 裕河乡, Xinmin 新民乡, and Guben 固本乡 townships
Jingzhou County, Hunan (in Caidiwan 菜地湾, etc.)
Huitong County, Hunan
Northern (Representative dialect: Yanghao village 养蒿村, Guading town 挂丁镇, Kaili city, Guizhou)
Kaili (in Yanghao 养蒿 of Guading Township 挂丁镇, etc.)
Leishan County
Taijiang County
Shibing County
Gedong 革东镇 in Jianhe County
Huangping County
Fuquan County
Weng'an County
Xingren County
parts of Anlong County
Yangwu 杨武乡, Longquan 龙泉镇, Paidiao 排调镇, Xingren 兴仁镇 townships, and also parts of Yahui 雅灰乡 in Danzhai County
Duyun
Bagu Township 坝固镇: Jijia 鸡贾, Yanglie 羊列, Baduo 把朵, Metao 么陶
Wangsi Township 王司镇: Taohua 桃花, Xinchang 新场, Wulu 乌路, Wuzhai 五寨
Pu'an Township 普安镇: Zongjiang 总奖村, Guanghua 光华村, Xingfu 幸福村
Northeastern
Zhaitou 寨头村, Baye 巴冶村, and Liangshan 良上村 villages of Sansui County
Gaoyongzhai 高雍寨, Guanme Township 观么乡, Jianhe County
Western (including Raojia; Representative dialect: Baixing village 白兴村, Heba township 河坝乡, Majiang County, Guizhou)
Heba Village 河坝村, Longshan Township 龙山乡, Majiang County
Raohe Village 绕河村, Luobang Township 洛邦乡, Duyun (also in Pingzhai 坪寨 of Wu'ai Village 五爱村)
Southern (Representative dialect: Yangpai village 羊排村, Yangwu township 扬武乡, Danzhai County, Guizhou)
Sandu County: Lalan 拉揽乡 (in Paishaozhai 排烧寨, etc.), Jiaoli 交梨乡, Dujiang 都江镇 townships; Jialan 甲揽, Yangwu 羊吴, Dediao 的刁, Hongguang 红光, and Wuyun 巫匀 villages of Pu'an Township 普安镇
Danzhai County: Paidao 排岛 and Paimo 排莫 of Yahui Township 雅灰乡
Southeastern 1 (Representative dialect: Datu village 大土村, Jiuqian township 九迁乡, Libo County, Guizhou)
Datu 大土村, Shuiwei 水维村, and Jialiao 甲料村 villages in Jiarong 佳荣镇 Township, Libo County
parts of Jiajiu 加鸠乡 Township, Congjiang County
Xunle Township 馴乐苗族乡, Huanjiang County
Southeastern 2 (Representative dialect: Zhenmin 振民, Gongdong township 拱洞乡, Rongshui County, Guangxi)
Bingmei 丙妹镇, Tingdong 停洞乡, Cuili 翠里乡, and much of the Yueliangshan 月亮山 area in Congjiang County
Rongjiang County
Rongshui County (in Gunqinzhai 滚琴寨 of Dongtou Township 洞头乡, Yaogao 尧告, etc.)
Sanjiang County
Northern Vietnam (Lang Son, Cao Bang, Bac Kan, and Tuyen Quang provinces): Na Meo language

Others
Sanqiao 三锹 (三橇) is a mixed Kam–Hmu language spoken in Liping County and Jinping County, Guizhou, China by about 6,000 people.

Classification
Hmu has been recognized as a branch of Hmongic since the 1950s. Wang (1985) recognized three varieties. Matisoff (2001) treated these as distinct languages, which is reflected in Ethnologue. Lee (2000) added a fourth variety, Western Hmu (10,000 speakers), among the Yao, and Matisoff (2006) lists seven (Daigong, Kaili [N], Lushan, Taijiang [N], Zhenfeng [N], Phö, Rongjiang [S]).

Writing
Northern Qiandong Miao, also known as Central Miao and as Eastern Guizhou Hmu (黔东方言 Qián-Dōng fāngyán), was chosen as the standard for Hmu-language textbooks in China, based on the pronunciation of Yǎnghāo (养蒿) village.

Phonology
The phonemic inventory and alphabetic transcription are as follows.

 is not distinct from a zero initial (that is, if we accept  as a consonant, there are no vowel-initial words in Hmu), and only occurs with tones 1, 3, 5, 7.

The aspirated nasals and fricatives do not exist in Southern or Eastern Hmu; cognates words use their unaspirated homologues. Further, in Eastern Hmu, di, ti merge into j, q; c merges into x; r (Northern ) merges into ni; and v is pronounced .

Ai  does not occur after palatalized consonants.  after palatalized consonants is spelled in.

Additional diphthongs occur in Chinese loans.

All dialects have eight tones. There is no sandhi. In the chart below, Northern Hmu is represented by Yanghao village (Kaili City), Eastern Hmu by 偶里 village (Jinping County), and Southern Hmu by 振民 (Rongshui County).

The lowest tones—Northern tones 4 and 6, Eastern tones 3 and 8, and Southern tone 6—are said to make the preceding consonant murmured (breathy voiced), presumably meaning that these are murmured tones as in other Hmongic languages.

References and notes

Further reading

External links

 Hmu basic lexicon at the Global Lexicostatistical Database

Hmongic languages
Languages of China